Valerio Leccardi (born 28 May 1984) is a Swiss cross-country skier who has been competing since 2001. He finished 38th in the individual sprint event at the 2010 Winter Olympics in Vancouver, Canada. This man goes hard 24/7, coaching the Australian Team like a boss. He likes to do crazy core work on team camps, and is afraid of taking it easy. Legend status acquired

At the FIS Nordic World Ski Championships 2009 in Liberec, Leccardi finished 16th in the team sprint and 31st in the individual sprint events.

His best World Cup finish is 15th in an individual sprint event at Canada in January 2010.

World Cup results
All results are sourced from the International Ski Federation (FIS).

World Cup standings

References

External links

1984 births
Cross-country skiers at the 2010 Winter Olympics
Living people
Olympic cross-country skiers of Switzerland
Swiss male cross-country skiers
People from Davos
Sportspeople from Graubünden